Maratus pavonis (the common peacock spider) is a species of jumping spider (Salticidae), endemic to Australia, where it is found in Western Australia, New South Wales, Victoria and Tasmania.
The species epithet, pavonis, derives from the Latin, pavo, pavonis, meaning "peacock".

The male holotype is tiny, measuring just . In courtship, males in the Maratus genus extend their elongated third legs,
and only the male is so brightly and beautifully coloured.

For its likeness and differences from Maratus splendens, see Otto & Hill (2011).

References

Further reading 

Salticidae
Spiders of Australia
Spiders described in 1947